Bullokar is a surname. Notable people with the surname include:

John Bullokar (1574–1627), English physician and lexicographer
William Bullokar (16th century), English linguist